Colonel Hathi's Pizza Outpost is a restaurant located in Adventureland, in Disneyland Paris. It opened in 1992 with the park under the name Explorer's Club. It specialises in a wide range of pizzas and pastas.

Explorer's Club

At the opening of the park, the building was originally known as Explorer's Club Restaurant. Housed in a colonial estate in a lush jungle where adventurers rest and have meals, the Club allowed guests to encounter famous European explorers, portrayed by cast actors, like David Livingstone or Ernest Hemingway. The featured soundtrack fitted the theme, with tunes such as Theresien-Fanfare, Colonel Bogey March, Onward, Christian Soldiers, Royal Air Force March Past or Cavalry of the Steppes.

The Club features a wide outdoor setting area, with one part overlooking waterfalls, and an inside room complete with trees displaying animatronic birds and animals (which was reminiscent of the Tiki Room). Some of these animals even interacted with the actors. The room is also ornamented with artifacts from numerous exotic regions, and murals representing journeys around the world.

The meals were originally colonial-inspired, and delivered on table.

The nearby ride Indiana Jones and the Temple of Peril still displays in its queueline part items featuring the name Explorer's Club.

Colonel Hathi's Pizza Outpost

In 1993, one year after the opening of the park, the decision was made to turn the restaurant into a counter service for East-Asian meals, since guests lacked interest in table meals. Some of the trees were removed to make way for counter services.

Then, in 1995, the restaurant became an eating place for pizzas and pastas. Its new chosen theme was Rudyard Kipling's Jungle Book, especially its Disney adaptation. Though not entirely, most of the original soundtrack was replaced with samples from this movie's one.

External links
 Photos Magiques - Colonel Hathi's Outpost
 Parkeology - Adventurer's Club & Explorer's Club
 DLP Synopsis - Explorer's Club / Colonel Hathi's Outpost
 EuroSouvenirland - Explorer's Club Restaurant

References

Colonel Hathi's Outpost
Adventureland (Disney)
Audio-Animatronic attractions
The Jungle Book (franchise)
Restaurants established in 1992
1992 establishments in France